Rolf Yngve Brodd (9 June 1930 – 23 September 2016) was a Swedish professional footballer who played as a striker. He began his career with Fritsla IF and then went on to represent Örebro SK, Toulouse, and Sochaux before retiring at IFK Göteborg in 1964. A full international between 1952 and 1963, he won 20 caps and scored 12 goals for the Sweden national team and was part of the Sweden squad that won bronze at the 1952 Summer Olympics.

Club career 
Brodd began his club career with Fristla IF, and signed for Örebro SK after having scored 32 goals in 33 games in the lower divisions. While at Örebro, he scored 7 goals in 19 games before moving to France where he represented Toulouse and Sochaux between 1953 and 1962. He then wrapped up his career at IFK Göteborg as player-manager, playing in 47 games and scoring 11 goals until his retirement as a player in 1964.

International career 
Brodd made his international debut for the Sweden national team on 14 May 1952, in a friendly 0–0 draw with the Netherlands. He scored his first international goal on 11 June 1952, scoring the second goal in a 2–0 win against Denmark. Brodd was selected to represent Sweden at the 1952 Summer Olympics, and scored three goals as Sweden finished third. Brodd scored five goals in four games during the 1962 FIFA World Cup qualification campaign, as Sweden failed to qualify for the 1962 FIFA World Cup. He made his last international appearance on 14 August 1963 in a friendly 0–0 draw with Norway, playing for 86 minutes before being replaced by Bertil "Bebben" Johansson.

Brodd won a total of 20 caps for the Sweden national team between 1952 and 1963, scoring 12 goals. He also represented the Sweden B team twice, scoring one goal.

Personal life 
Brodd died on 23 September 2016 in Gothenburg.

Career statistics

International 

 Scores and results list Sweden's goal tally first, score column indicates score after each Brodd goal.

Honours 
Sweden

 Summer Olympics bronze: 1952
Individual

 Stor Grabb: 1952

References

External links
 

1930 births
2016 deaths
Association football forwards
Swedish footballers
Sweden international footballers
Örebro SK players
Ligue 1 players
FC Sochaux-Montbéliard players
IFK Göteborg players
Footballers at the 1952 Summer Olympics
Olympic bronze medalists for Sweden
Olympic footballers of Sweden
Expatriate footballers in France
Swedish football managers
IFK Göteborg managers
Olympic medalists in football
Medalists at the 1952 Summer Olympics